Opisthotropis jacobi, the Chapa mountain keelback or Jacob's Mountain stream keelback, is a species of natricine snake found in Vietnam and China.

References

Opisthotropis
Reptiles described in 1933
Reptiles of Vietnam
Reptiles of China
Taxa named by Fernand Angel
Taxa named by René Léon Bourret